In the Wings: Behind the Scenes at the New York City Ballet is a book by Kyle Froman.  It was released in September 2007 in hardcover.

In this book Kyle Froman explores the physically demanding life of New York City Ballet dancers.  Froman takes his camera behind the scenes and offers a glimpse into the ballet world that outsiders rarely see:  the daily training, the injuries, the last-minute cast changes, and ultimately, the transcendent moments onstage at the end of the day.

The book is told as Kyle's personal diary of a dancer's day: Ch.1 is "10:15AM," Ch. 2 is "11:30AM," Ch. 3 is "2:15," Ch. 4 is "6:15," and Ch. 5 is "Showtime." From morning company class to rehearsal to performance, the text offers intriguing insights into the mental discipline and emotions that come into play in preparing for the show.

The foreword is written by Peter Martins, balletmaster in chief of New York City Ballet.  He says of the book, "Here is the New York City Ballet as it really is – the good, the not so good, and the majestically beautiful.  It's a true story, and it's told by someone who can honestly claim that he was there."

See also
Ballet music
History of ballet
List of ballets by title

References

2007 books
Books about ballet
Dance in New York City